The 2010 Kansas Jayhawks football team (variously "Kansas", "KU", or the "Jayhawks") represented the University of Kansas in the 2010 NCAA Division I FBS football season which was the school's 121st season. The Jayhawks played their home games on Kivisto Field at Memorial Stadium in Lawrence, Kansas.

The team was led by first year head coach Turner Gill and was a member of the Big 12 Conference in the North Division. The team captains were senior running back Angus Quigley, senior offensive lineman Sal Capra, senior defensive end Jake Laptad, senior linebacker Justin Springer, and senior cornerback Chris Harris.

The Jayhawks finished the season 3–9, 1–7 in Big 12 play and did not play for bowl game for the second consecutive year, but was highlighted with a 35-point fourth-quarter comeback against Colorado, making it the Jayhawks' largest comeback in program history, as well as the largest fourth quarter comeback of all time.

Pre-season

Coaching changes
Former head coach Mark Mangino resigned from his position on December 3, following a 7-game losing streak and internal investigation into his conduct. Turner Gill, former head coach at the University at Buffalo was named the new head coach on December 13, 2009. Gill will bring with him Carl Torbush as his defensive coordinator and Chuck Long as his offensive coordinator. None of Mangino's assistant coaches or strength and conditioning staff were retained by Gill.

Recruiting
Expand the list below to see the full recruiting class.

Watch lists

Jake Laptad - Hendricks Award Watchlist
Tim Biere - John Mackey Award Watchlist

Schedule

Roster

Game summaries

North Dakota State

Turner Gill's debut game for the Jayhawks ended in dismay as the FCS Bison team defeated Kansas 6-3. Although Kansas took a lead in the first quarter with a field goal, the Bison scored 2 field goals, 1 in the first half and the other in the second, to knock off Jayhawks. Kansas had 3 turnovers in the game, causing the Bison to lead in time of possession.

Georgia Tech

Trying to rebound after the loss against the FCS Bison, Kansas was considered an underdog against the heavily favored, 15th ranked, Georgia Tech. Redshirt Freshman Jordan Webb took over the starting QB role and true Freshman James Sims was introduced at running back. In the first half, Kansas scored two touchdowns, but the Yellow Jackets were ahead by a field goal at halftime, 17-14. However, in the third quarter, Kansas would score an unanswered touchdown to take the lead at 21-17. In the first drive of the fourth quarter, the Jayhawks would score yet another touchdown. However, Georgia Tech scored a touchdown in the fourth quarter to try to pull off a comeback. Then, with a minute to play in regulation, Georgia Tech's drive stopped with a turnover on downs that ended the Yellow Jackets' hopes of winning. The final would be 28-25, with Kansas winning. This would be the first time since 2008 that Kansas defeated a ranked opponent, defeating the then #11 Missouri Tigers 40-37. The win remains (as of the conclusion of the 2021 season) the Jayhawks last win over a ranked opponent.

Southern Miss

New Mexico State

Baylor

Kansas State

Texas A&M

Iowa State

Colorado

Nebraska

Oklahoma State

Missouri

Awards and honors
Justin Springer
Big 12 Defensive Player of the Week (week 2) - 15 tackles, 1 sack against #15 Georgia Tech

D.J. Beshears
Big 12 Special Teams Player of the Week (week 4)

References

Kansas
Kansas Jayhawks football seasons
Kansas Jayhawks football